Alfred Henry Scott (24 June 1868 – 17 July 1939) was a British Liberal politician.

Background
Scott was born in Ardwick, Manchester, the eldest son of Charles Henry Scott JP. He was educated at Altrincham Grammar School; Tideswell Grammar School and Lichfield Grammar School. In 1907 he married Katherine Duncan, the widow of Mr Lewis of Kentucky.

He entered business as a merchant in the city. He was elected to Manchester City Council in 1897. At the 1900 general election he was the Liberal candidate at Manchester East, where he stood against the Conservative First Lord of the Treasury, Arthur Balfour. In his election address he set out his political views: he supported reform of the Army, Home Rule for Ireland, the temperance movement, abolition of the House of Lords, and nationalisation or municipalisation of land, railways and mines.

At the next general election in 1906 he stood at Ashton under Lyne, and was elected as the town's Member of Parliament. 

Following his election to parliament, he stood down from Manchester City Council, after 9 years service. In 1907 he became Vice-President of the Association of Municipal Corporations. Whilst an MP he voted in favour of the 1908 Women's Enfranchisement Bill. 
He held the seat at the January 1910 election.

A second general election was held in December of the same year. Scott was defeated by the Canadian millionaire Max Aitken (later Lord Beaverbrook), who had been "parachuted" in as the Liberal Unionist candidate.

Scott moved to London. In 1913 he contested the 1913 London County Council election as a Progressive Party candidate at Greenwich but was defeated. 

Despite this defeat he was immediately appointed to be a Progressive Party alderman on the London County Council. The Progressives were the municipal wing of the Liberal Party in London. He remained a member of the LCC until 1919. 
Scott attempted to return to the Commons, and was the unsuccessful Liberal candidate at Darlington in 1918, where the Unionist candidate was endorsed by the Coalition Government;

In 1922 he stood for election to the London County Council and was defeated by a Municipal Reform Party opponent in the St Pancras South East Division.

Later that year he again stood as a candidate at the General Election;
West Ham Stratford in 1922 

and the following year he stood for parliament at Finsbury in 1923. 

He retired to Birchington, Margate where he was appointed as an Alderman and served as a Justice of the Peace. He died in Thanet, Kent aged 71.

External links

References

1868 births
1939 deaths
Liberal Party (UK) MPs for English constituencies
UK MPs 1906–1910
UK MPs 1910
People from Ardwick
Members of London County Council
Progressive Party (London) politicians
Members of the Parliament of the United Kingdom for Ashton-under-Lyne